The Per Artem ad Deum medal (Eng. Through Arts to God) annual award presented by the Pontifical Council for Culture in recognition of the achievements  which contribute to the promotion of dialogue between the diversity of cultures in the contemporary world and thus promote man as an individual.

The Medal Chapter 

The Medal Chapter comprises: Reverend Bishop Marian Florczyk - the Chapter Chairman, Andrzej Mochoń PhD, Professor Konrad Kucza-Kuczyński and the previous years' laureates: Tomasz Furdyna, Dobrosław Bagiński PhD. Hab, professor , professor Leszek Mądzik, Wojciech Kilar, Krzysztof Zanussi, Stanisław Niemczyk.

Laureates 
The Per Artem ad Deum Medal has been presented to:

 2005 - Stained glass workshop "Furdyna" - Krakow
 2006 - Dobroslaw Bagiński 
 2007 - Stanisław Słonina 
 2008 - Leszek Mądzik 
 2009 - Wojciech Kilar 
 2010 – Krzysztof Zanussi 
 2011 – Stanisław Niemczyk
 2012 - Ennio Morricone and  Stefan Stuligrosz  
 2013 – Stanisław Rodziński
 2014 – Mario Botta, 
 2015 - Krzysztof Penderecki, Wincenty Kućma, Herder Publishing House 
 2016 - Antonina Krzysztoń, Arvo Pärt, Arnaldo Pomodoro
 2017 - Claudia Henzler, Father Professor Michał Heller and Father Tomas Halik

The Medal awarding ceremony 
The Per Artem ad Deum Medal has been presented at the International Exhibition of Church Construction, Church Fittings and Furnishings and Religious Art SACROEXPO held in Targi Kielce exhibition centre located in Kielce, Poland. The Medal is awarded at a special gala ceremony. The medal laureates are presented the distinction by the Chapter members and the church high-ranking dignitaries; twice - in 2009 and 2012 - the Medal was handed by the President of the Pontifical Council for Culture, Cardinal Gianfranco Ravasi. In the case of Stefan Stuligrosz and Ennio Morricone, the Medal Medal awarding ceremony gained extra splendour owing to live concert of the Świętokrzyskie Philharmonic Orchestra and Cracow Philharmonic Choir performing the new version of the Tra Cielo e Terra dedicated to John Paul II.

Photos

References 

European arts awards
Pontifical Council for Culture
Orders, decorations, and medals of the Holy See